Major-General Eldon Nicholas Somerville Millar,  is a senior British Army officer who currently serves as Defence Services Secretary.

Military career
Millar was commissioned the Royal Engineers on 14 October 1994. After serving as commanding officer of 33 Engineer Regiment (EOD), he became head of Army Engagement and Communications in October 2019 and Defence Services Secretary in 2022. He was appointed a Member of the Order of the British Empire in March 2010 and received the Queen's Commendation for Valuable Service in March 2016.

References

 

Living people
British Army generals
British Army personnel of the Iraq War
British Army personnel of the War in Afghanistan (2001–2021)
Members of the Order of the British Empire
Recipients of the Commendation for Valuable Service
Year of birth missing (living people)